Una y Otra Vez (Once and Again) is a studio album released by Sergent Garcia. It received a Latin Grammy nomination for Best Tropical Fusion Album.

Track List

Further reading
Washington Post review
Allmusic review
About.com review
PopMatters review

2011 albums
Sergent Garcia albums
Spanish-language albums
Cumbancha albums